Constantinos Soteriou (born 21 June 1996) is a Cypriot professional footballer who plays as a centre back for Hapoel Haifa on loan from AEL Limassol and the Cyprus national team.

International career
He made his debut for Cyprus national football team on 24 March 2021 in a World Cup qualifier against Slovakia.

References

External links
 
 

1996 births
Living people
Sportspeople from Nicosia
Cypriot footballers
Olympiakos Nicosia players
Anorthosis Famagusta F.C. players
Doxa Katokopias FC players
AEL Limassol players
Hapoel Haifa F.C. players
Cypriot First Division players
Israeli Premier League players
Cypriot expatriate footballers
Expatriate footballers in Israel
Cypriot expatriate sportspeople in Israel
Cyprus youth international footballers
Cyprus under-21 international footballers
Cyprus international footballers
Association football defenders